There are more than 40 private and public universities in Chile that grant undergraduate and graduate degrees in business fields as administration, economics, finance, marketing and human resources.

The list below are the most popular national rankings based on business managers and recruiters surveys. All of the universities mentioned are accredited by the National Accreditation Commission (CNA) due to they have achieved the higher educational standards imposed by this government institution.

Top ranked Business Schools in Chile 
Ranking top ten "Que Pasa Magazine" 2008 (All business schools)

Ranking Top Ten Private Business Schools with more future. "Que Pasa Magazine" 2008.

Top business schools according to school reputation and potential students preferences. El Mercurio Online (Journal), 2007.

 
Lists of business schools